The 1997 Japanese Touring Car Championship season was the 13th edition of the series. It began at Fuji Speedway on 6 April and finished after eight events, also at Fuji Speedway on 2 November. The championship was won by Osamu Nakako, driving for Mugen Honda.

Teams & Drivers

Calendar

Championship Standings
Points were awarded 15, 12, 9, 7, 6, 5, 4, 3, 2, 1 to the top 10 finishers in each race, with no bonus points for pole positions or fastest laps. Drivers would have counted their best 12 scores, but with the cancellation of the first two races of the season, only the ten best were counted.

References

Japanese Touring Car Championship
Japanese Touring Car Championship seasons